Daniele Napoletano (born 20 April 1993) is an Italian footballer who plays as a forward for Serie D club F.C. Matese.

Club career
Born in Piedimonte Matese, in the Province of Caserta, Campania, Italy, Napoletano spent the 2013–14 season with Sesto Campano, before signing for hometown club Tre Pini Matese during the following campaign. He stayed with Tre Pini for two seasons, after which he transferred to Serie D side Sangiovannese in the 2016–17 season. In his first spell at the Piedimonte Matese club, Napoletano recorded 93 goals over the course of three seasons. Having amassed 43 goals in 31 games for Tre Pini in the 2015–16 season, Napoletano's goalscoring feats were compared to that of Leicester City's Jamie Vardy and then-Napoli forward, Gonzalo Higuaín. After making just two appearances in Serie D, he left Sangiovannese and re-joined Tre Pini in September 2016. Napoletano departed the Campanian club for the second time in September 2017; transferring to Vastogirardi. Having managed 3 goals in three matches, he re-signed for a third time with Tre Pini. Napoletano scored a goal in his first game back at Ferrante. He scored a brace for Tre Pini, against Spinete, in a 1–5 away win for the Campanian side.

References

External links
 Profile at TuttoCampo 
 

1993 births
Living people
Sportspeople from Piedimonte Matese
Italian footballers
A.S.D. Tre Pini Matese players
A.S.D. Sangiovannese 1927 players
A.S.D. Football Club Matese players
Serie D players
Association football forwards
Footballers from Campania